Lincoln Home National Historic Site preserves the Springfield, Illinois home and related historic district where Abraham Lincoln lived from 1844 to 1861, before becoming the 16th president of the United States.  The presidential memorial includes the four blocks surrounding the home and a visitor center.

Historic site
In 1837, Lincoln moved to Springfield from New Salem at the start of his law career.  He met his wife, Mary Todd, at her sister's home in Springfield and married there in 1842.

The historic-site house at 413 South Eighth Street at the corner of Jackson Street, bought by Lincoln and his wife in 1844, was the only home that Lincoln ever owned. Three of their children were born there and one, Eddie, died there.  The house contains twelve rooms spread over two floors. During the time he lived here, Lincoln was elected to the House of Representatives in 1846, and elected President in 1860.

The Lincoln Home has been completely restored to its 1860 appearance.

Lincoln's son, Robert Todd Lincoln donated the family home to the State of Illinois in 1887 under the condition that it would forever be well maintained and open to the public at no charge. This came as a result of tenants who would charge those who wanted to visit Lincoln's home and that many tenants tended to leave the home in disrepair.   The home and Lincoln Tomb, also in Springfield, were designated National Historic Landmarks on December 19, 1960, and automatically listed on the National Register of Historic Places on October 15, 1966.  The home and adjacent district became a National Historic Site on August 18, 1971  and is owned and administered by the National Park Service.  It is one of two National Park Service properties in Illinois.

Other structures

Along with the Lincoln Home, several other structures within the four-block area are also preserved. All the homes have been restored to their appearance during the time Lincoln lived in the neighborhood. Two of these structures, the Dean House and the Arnold House, are open to visitors and house exhibits on the life and times of Lincoln and his neighbors. In total, the buildings included in the park occupy .

Samuel Rosenwald purchased the Lyon House on Eighth Street across from Lincoln's home in 1868. Samuel's son Julius Rosenwald went on to become president of Sears Roebuck and Company and a major philanthropist; the Lyon House was Julius's boyhood home. A plaque was unveiled when the house was renamed in his honor in 2020.

Neighborhood
Nearby in Springfield is the Old State Capitol where Lincoln served as a State Legislator, the building which housed the law offices of Lincoln and his partner William Herndon from 1844 until 1852, and the Lincoln Depot from which Lincoln left the city for his 1861 inauguration.

See also

 List of residences of presidents of the United States
 Presidential memorials in the United States

References

External links

 
 National Historic Landmark information
 Lincoln Home National Historic Site:A Place of Growth and Memory, a National Park Service Teaching with Historic Places (TwHP) lesson plan
"Life Portrait of Abraham Lincoln", from C-SPAN's American Presidents: Life Portraits, broadcast from Lincoln Home National Historic Site, June 28, 1999

Abraham Lincoln in Springfield, Illinois
National Historic Landmarks in Illinois
National Historic Sites in Illinois
Presidential homes in the United States
Illinois in the American Civil War
Historic house museums in Illinois
Museums in Springfield, Illinois
Presidential museums in Illinois
Protected areas established in 1971
National Register of Historic Places in Springfield, Illinois
Protected areas of Sangamon County, Illinois
Abraham Lincoln National Heritage Area
Houses on the National Register of Historic Places in Illinois
1971 establishments in Illinois
Houses in Springfield, Illinois
Monuments and memorials to Abraham Lincoln in the United States